The Munshiganj Raebareli massacre was a massacre perpetrated by the Indian Imperial Police on 7 January 1921 at Munshiganj, Raebareli, India. The official death toll as per British historians was minimal, while other estimates put the death toll in the hundreds.

A large number of peasants assembled in Raebareli, demanding release of their leaders. Veer Pal Singh opened fire and on hearing the firing sound, a detachment of mounted police fired randomly at peasants, killing several.

The total number of deaths are not recorded, although it was reported that the nearby Sai river turned red from the blood. This massacre is considered the second-biggest massacre by British colonial authorities, after only Jallianwala Bagh massacre in 1919. National Herald newspaper reported 13 deaths. Jawaharlal Nehru was there. A memorial of the massacre stands in Munshiganj.

References

Conflicts in 1921
Massacres in 1921
1921 in British India
Protests in British India
Massacres in British India
Massacres committed by the United Kingdom
Political repression in British India
1921 in India
Indian independence movement
April 1921 events